is a Japanese footballer who plays for Omiya Ardija.

Club statistics
Updated to end of 2018 season.

References

External links

Profile at Omiya Ardija

1995 births
Living people
Association football people from Saitama Prefecture
Japanese footballers
J1 League players
J2 League players
J3 League players
Omiya Ardija players
J.League U-22 Selection players
Association football midfielders